W1XAY was one of the first television stations in the world, being founded on June 14, 1928. It was called as "WLEX" from its sister radio station, in Lexington, Massachusetts, United States (near Boston), the current day WVEI in Worcester.

The television station broadcast on a wavelength of 85.7 meters (3.5 MHz), with 48 vertical lines of resolution, and 18 frames per second. It shut down in March 1930.

The station was owned by the Boston Post, which also owned WLEX.

The WLEX call letters now reside with WLEX-TV, the NBC television network affiliate in Lexington, Kentucky.

See also 
 List of experimental television stations
 W1XAV

References

External links 
 How Television came to Boston — The Forgotten Story of W1XAY, by Donna L. Halper

1928 establishments in Massachusetts
1930 disestablishments in Massachusetts
Experimental television stations
History of television in the United States
Television pioneers
Television channels and stations established in 1928
Television channels and stations disestablished in 1930
Defunct mass media in Boston
Defunct television stations in the United States